The 1996 AFL Grand Final was an Australian rules football game contested between the  North Melbourne Football Club and the Sydney Swans, held at the Melbourne Cricket Ground in Melbourne on 28 September 1996. It was the 100th annual Grand Final of the Australian Football League (formerly the Victorian Football League), staged to determine the premiers for the 1996 AFL season. The match, attended by 93,102 people, was won by North Melbourne by a margin of 43 points, marking that club's third premiership victory. North Melbourne were awarded a gold premiership cup instead of the usual silver in honour of the centenary grand final.

Background

Sydney were playing in a Grand Final for the first time since relocating from South Melbourne. It was the Swans' first appearance in a premiership decider since losing the 1945 VFL Grand Final, while it was North Melbourne's first since losing the 1978 VFL Grand Final.

At the conclusion of the home and away season, Sydney had finished first on the AFL ladder with 16 wins and 5 losses and one draw, winning the McClelland Trophy. North Melbourne had finished second with 16 wins and 6 losses.

The lead-up to the game was dominated by the tribunal case of Sydney defender Andrew Dunkley, who was to be the Swans' match-up for star Kangaroos forward Wayne Carey. On the Wednesday before the Grand Final, Dunkley was reported on video evidence – which was still relatively uncommon practice at the time – for striking 's James Hird in the previous week's preliminary final. On the Thursday, Sydney successfully obtained a Supreme Court injunction to prevent the case from being heard until after the Grand Final, with the judge ruling that requiring Dunkley to face the tribunal only one day after learning of the charge and two days before the Grand Final would deny him natural justice and deny him the time required to prepare a defence. Consequently, Dunkley was free to play. When Dunkley ultimately faced the tribunal, he was suspended for three weeks.

Match summary

The AFL's centenary year was crowned by North Melbourne which made amends for the disappointment of three successive failed finals campaigns. The Kangaroos won their third flag (and the only Gold Premiership Cup in history) despite a slow start. Led by bullocking defender Glenn Archer and superstars Corey McKernan and Wayne Carey, the Kangaroos were hellbent in their premiership quest.

The Swans, although overwhelmed at the finish, started well and kicked the last three goals of the first quarter to lead by 18 points at quarter time. When Jason Mooney scored early in the second quarter the Swans' lead extend to 24 points. However, Glenn Freeborn's move to the forward line sparked the Kangaroos, with Freeborn kicking three goals for the quarter and Darren Crocker and Brett Allison each kicking one, and by half time the Kangaroos led by 2 points.

North Melbourne dominated the third quarter, with two goals to Craig Sholl and one each to Peter Bell and Crocker, which saw them leading by 25 points at three quarter time.

The Kangaroos kicked the first two goals of the final quarter through Anthony Stevens and Mark Roberts to effectively kill the contest. The two teams traded goals until the end of the game, with North ultimately triumphing by 43 points.

Tony Lockett tried hard for the Swans in his first and only Grand Final, booting six goals. Paul Roos was playing in his 314th game of VFL/AFL football. He continues to hold the record for the most games played before participating in his first Grand Final.

The Norm Smith Medal was awarded to Archer for being judged the best player afield.

Teams

Goal kickers

References

External links
Match details at AFL Tables

See also
 1996 AFL season

VFL/AFL Grand Finals
AFL Grand Final, 1996
1996 Australian Football League season
North Melbourne Football Club
Sydney Swans